Nasirabad (also Romanized as Naşīrābād and Nasīr Ābād; also known as Naşrābād and Naşrābād-e ‘Olyā) is a village in Binalud Rural District, in the Central District of Nishapur County, Razavi Khorasan Province, Iran. At the 2006 census, its population was 195, in 49 families.

References 

Populated places in Nishapur County